The Devon Closewool is a British breed of domestic sheep. It is distributed almost exclusively on Exmoor in North Devon, in south-west England. It is raised primarily for meat.

History 

The Devon Closewool was developed in the second half of the nineteenth century by cross-breeding native Exmoor ewes with Devon Longwool rams. The oldest known flock dates from 1894. A breed society – the Devon Closewool Sheep Breeders' Society – was formed in 1923, and a flock-book was started in the same year. By 1950 there were close to 230 000 head. In 2009 total breed numbers were estimated to be 5 000.

Characteristics 

It is solidly built, with strong legs. It is naturally polled in both sexes, white-woolled and white-faced, with black nostrils and short ears. The fleece is dense and of medium length and staple. It is a hardy grassland breed, well suited to grazing on the grasslands and heaths of the uplands of its area of distribution.

Use 

The Devon Closewool is reared for meat and for wool. 

Ewes have good maternal qualities, and a lambing percentage of some 150–160%. Ewes may be put to rams of a terminal breed such as the Suffolk or Texel to produce cross-bred lambs; these grow fast and quickly reach slaughter weight. Ewes may also be put to ram of a breed such as the Blue-faced Leicester to produce more prolific cross-bred "mule" ewes; this is however uncommon.

References

Sheep breeds originating in England
Sheep breeds
Devon